Dead End Glacier is a glacier flowing east from the south end of the Salvesen Range of South Georgia into the west side of Salomon Glacier. It was surveyed by the South Georgia Survey in the period 1951–57, and so named by the UK Antarctic Place-Names Committee because there is no route for sledging parties from the head of this glacier to the north shore of Drygalski Fjord.

See also
 List of glaciers in the Antarctic
 Glaciology

References

 

Glaciers of South Georgia